Lydia "Lizzie" Burns (6 August 1827 – 12 September 1878 in London) was a working-class Irish woman, the wife of Friedrich Engels.

Lizzie Burns was a daughter of Michael Burns or Byrne, a dyer in a cotton mill, and of Mary Conroy. The family may have lived off Deansgate. Her mother died in 1835, and her father remarried a year later.

Lizzie had an elder sister Mary (1821–1863), a lifelong partner of Engels until her sudden death of a heart disease. Mary Burns and Engels considered marriage a bourgeois institution and never married. In the 1850s, when Mary Burns and Engels lived in Ardwick, Lizzie stayed with them as a housekeeper, and after her sister's death eventually became Engels' partner. In the 1870s they lived openly as a couple in London, with Lizzie's niece, Mary Ellen (known as Pumps), as a housekeeper.

Both Lizzie and her sister were known as formally illiterate yet intelligent women, with strong working-class ties. They showed Engels the actual conditions of the factory employees in Britain. Eleanor Marx wrote that

Rachel Holms notes that "Like her sister,  Lizzie Burns was a dedicated player in the Irish Republican movement, and the house she shared with Engels at 86 Mornington Street was a meeting place and a safe house for Fenian activists. She was freedom-loving, uncorseted, fiercely political and sparkling with fun". Lizzie had considerable influence on the young Eleanor Marx, converting her to an enthusiastic supporter of Irish Nationalism and the Fenians (Rachel Holmes "Eleanor Marx - a life", London, 2014, p. 88.) While her father Karl Marx had some reservations about the Fenians' violent methods, Eleanor completely identified with them, regularly signing her letters to Lizzie as "Eleanor, F.S." (Fenian Sister).

In early September 1878 Burns fell seriously ill with some kind of tumor, and to please her religious beliefs, Engels married her. She died hours later. Her death made a strong impression on Engels. He later wrote about her:

Engels had Lydia buried at St Mary's Catholic Cemetery, Kensal Green and wrote on the gravestone: ″LYDIA , Wife of Frederick Engels".

References

Karl Marx
1827 births
1878 deaths
Irish activists
Irish women activists
English activists
English women activists
British activists
People from Salford
English people of Irish descent
Burials at St Mary's Catholic Cemetery, Kensal Green
Friedrich Engels